VIM Airlines (legally VIM Avia) was a Russian charter airline headquartered in Moscow based at Domodedovo International Airport. It offered international scheduled and charter operations for both passengers and cargo as well as wet lease services. Its licence was revoked by 4 November 2017 after its operations were suspended a few weeks earlier.

History
VIM Airlines was established by Viktor Ivanovich Merkulov (hence the name of the company) and started operations in 2000, with an Ilyushin Il-62M. At the end of 2004, the company acquired Chitaavia and Aerobratsk, followed by Russian Sky Airlines in 2005.

On 28 September 2017, CEO Alexander Cochnev and Chief Accountant Yekaterina Panteleyeva were arrested after an embezzlement case against the employers of the company.

In late September 2017 VIM Airlines' aircraft were seized at foreign airports and several routes were cancelled, including all operations from its home base Moscow-Domodedovo. The airline's aircraft were seized by lessors in Turkey following ongoing investigations by the Russian authorities. The airline suspended all charter operations in September 2017 and suspended all scheduled operations on 15 October 2017. On 4 November 2017, the airline's license was revoked by Russian authorities as the airline was unable to resume flights.

Destinations

Fleet

Former fleet
As of 23 September 2017, the VIM Airlines fleet consisted of the following aircraft:

Retired fleet
VIM Airlines previously operated the following aircraft:

 Ilyushin Il-62M
 Tupolev Tu-154 (leased from Aviaprad)
 Yakovlev Yak-42 (leased from KrasAir)

See also 
 List of defunct airlines of Russia

References

External links

 Official website

Defunct airlines of Russia
Companies based in Moscow
Airlines established in 2000
Airlines disestablished in 2017
Russian companies established in 2000
2017 disestablishments in Russia